Algeria competed at the 2009 Mediterranean Games in Pescara, Italy. 98 men and 30 women representing 128 competitors participated at this edition.

Medal summary

Medal table

|  style="text-align:left; width:78%; vertical-align:top;"|

Weightlifting

Men

Nations at the 2009 Mediterranean Games
2009
Mediterranean Games